Bill Deague (14 October 1912 – 31 August 1995) was  a former Australian rules footballer who played with Melbourne and Hawthorn in the Victorian Football League (VFL).		
	
Deague left Hawthorn for the seaside town of Warrnambool.

Notes

External links 

1912 births
1995 deaths
Australian rules footballers from Victoria (Australia)
Melbourne Football Club players
Hawthorn Football Club players
Warrnambool Football Club players